Joshguna Aliyeva (born 22 March 2002) is an Azerbaijani footballer, who plays as a midfielder for Turkish Women's Super League club Kireçburnu Spor and the Azerbaijan women's national team.

Club career 
In December 2021, Aliyeva moved to Turkey and joined Kdz. Ereğli Belediye Spor to play in the Turkish Women's Super League. In the 2022-23 Turkish Super League season, she transferred to Kireçburnu Spor.

See also 
List of Azerbaijan women's international footballers

References

External links 

2002 births
Living people
Women's association football midfielders
Azerbaijani women's footballers
Azerbaijan women's international footballers
Azerbaijani expatriate footballers
Azerbaijani expatriate sportspeople in Turkey
Expatriate women's footballers in Turkey
Turkish Women's Football Super League players
Karadeniz Ereğlispor players
Kireçburnu Spor players